Bisbenzimide (Hoechst 33342) is an organic compound used as a fluorescent stain for DNA in molecular biology applications.  Several related chemical compounds are used for similar purposes and are collectively called Hoechst stains.

Application
Bisbenzimide tends to bind to adenine–thymine-rich regions of DNA and can decrease its density. Bisbenzimide mixed with DNA samples can then be used to separate DNA according to their AT percentage using a cesium chloride (CsCl) gradient centrifugation.

References

External links
 Fluorescence Spectra: http://www.fluorophores.tugraz.at/substance/463

DNA-binding substances
Fluorescent dyes
Benzimidazoles
Piperazines